Antony Gautier (born 19 November 1977, in Seclin) is a French former football referee who officiated primarily in Ligue 1.

Gautier became a FIFA referee in 2010 and served as a referee in 2014 World Cup qualifiers.

In June 2020, Gautier was elected mayor of the French city Bailleul.

Despite appearing on the list of referees for the 2022-23 Ligue 1 season, Gautier did not take charge of any games and in January 2023, he was appointed as director of refereeing in France. His final match as a referee was the relegation play-off tie between St Etienne and Auxerre, which Auxerre won on penalties.

References

External links 
 
 
 
 

1981 births
Living people
People from Seclin
French football referees
UEFA Europa League referees
Sportspeople from Nord (French department)